Nasirabad (also Romanized as Naşīrābād; also known as Onaşīrābād) is a village in Behnamarab-e Jonubi Rural District, Javadabad District, Varamin County, Tehran Province, Iran. At the 2006 census, its population was 16, in 8 families.

References 

Populated places in Varamin County